Omar Gaye (born 18 September 1998) is a Gambian professional footballer who plays as a left back for Maccabi Netanya and the Gambia national team.

Career
Orphaned at the age of 11, Gaye played football in Europe to support his two siblings. Gaye arrived to Italy as a migrant in 2016. After arriving to Italy, Gaye started playing football for Afro Napoli.

From Afro Napoli, Gaye moved to Juve Stabia in August 2017. He had stints at the Italian clubs Viareggio, and Nola before moving to Finland with Kajaani. He transferred to Milsami Orhei in Moldova shortly after for the 2020–21 season. Gaye made his professional debut with Milsami Orhei in a 3–0 Moldovan National Division win over Speranța Nisporeni on 13 July 2020.

International career
Gaye debuted for the Gambia in a 1–0 friendly win over Togo on 8 June 2021.

References

External links
 
 
 

1998 births
Living people
Sportspeople from Banjul
Gambian footballers
Association football fullbacks
S.S. Juve Stabia players
AC Kajaani players
FC Milsami Orhei players
Maccabi Netanya F.C. players
Serie D players
Ykkönen players
Moldovan Super Liga players
Israeli Premier League players
The Gambia international footballers
Gambian expatriate footballers
Gambian expatriate sportspeople in Italy
Expatriate footballers in Italy
Gambian expatriate sportspeople in Finland
Expatriate footballers in Finland
Gambian expatriate sportspeople in Moldova
Expatriate footballers in Moldova
Gambian expatriate sportspeople in Israel
Expatriate footballers in Israel